Elections in the Republic of India in 1985 included elections to fourteen state legislative assemblies.

Legislative Assembly elections

Andhra Pradesh

Assam

Bihar

Source:

Gujarat

Himachal Pradesh

Source:

Karnataka

|- align=center
!style="background-color:#E9E9E9" class="unsortable"|
!style="background-color:#E9E9E9" align=center|Political Party
!style="background-color:#E9E9E9" |Seats Contested
!style="background-color:#E9E9E9" |Seats Won
!style="background-color:#E9E9E9" |Number of Votes
!style="background-color:#E9E9E9" |% of Votes
!style="background-color:#E9E9E9" |Seat change
|-
| 
|align="left"|Janata Party||205||139||6,418,795||43.60%|| 44
|-
| 
|align="left"|Indian National Congress||223||65||6,009,461||40.82%|| 17
|-
| 
|align="left"|Communist Party of India||7||3||133,008||0.90%||
|-
| 
|align="left"|Bharatiya Janata Party||116||2||571,280||3.88%|| 16
|-
| 
|align="left"|Communist Party of India (Marxist)||7||2||127,333||0.86%|| 1
|-
| 
|align="left"|Independents||1200||13||1,393,626||9.47%|| 9
|-
|
|align="left"|Total||1795||224||14,720,634||||
|-
|}

Madhya Pradesh

Source:

Maharashtra

|- align=center
!style="background-color:#E9E9E9" class="unsortable"|
!style="background-color:#E9E9E9" align=center|Political Party
!style="background-color:#E9E9E9" |No. of candidates
!style="background-color:#E9E9E9" |No. of elected
!style="background-color:#E9E9E9" |Number of Votes
!style="background-color:#E9E9E9" |% of Votes
!style="background-color:#E9E9E9" |Seat change
|-
| 
|align="left"|Indian National Congress||287||161||9,522,556||43.41%|| 25
|-
| 
|align="left"|Indian National Congress (Socialist)||126||54||3,790,850||17.28%|| 54
|-
| 
|align="left"|Janata Party||61||20||1,618,101||7.38%|| 20
|-
| 
|align="left"|Bharatiya Janata Party||67||16||1,590,351||7.25%|| 2
|-
| 
|align="left"|Peasants and Workers Party of India||29||13||825,949||3.77%|| 4
|-
| 
|align="left"|Communist Party of India||31||2||202,790||0.92%||
|-
| 
|align="left"|Communist Party of India (Marxist)||14||2||174,350||0.79%||
|-
| 
|align="left"|Independents||1506||20||3,836,390||17.49%|| 10
|-
|
|align="left"|Total||2230||288||21,934,742|| ||
|-
|}

Odisha

|- style="background-color:#E9E9E9; text-align:center;"
! class="unsortable" |
! Political Party !! Flag !! Seats  Contested !! Won !! Net Change  in seats !! % of  Seats
! Votes !! Vote % !! Change in vote %
|- style="background: #90EE90;"
| 
| style="text-align:left;" |Indian National Congress
| 
| 147 || 117

|| 1 || 79.59 || 40,07,258 || 51.08 ||  3.3
|-
| 
| style="text-align:left;" |Communist Party of India (Marxist)
|
| 27 || 1 || - || 0.68 || 89,225 || 15.97 || -
|-
| 
| style="text-align:left;" |Bharatiya Janata Party
|
| 67 || 1 ||  1 || 0.68|| 2,04,346|| 5.66 ||  1.43
|-
| 
| style="text-align:left;" |Communist Party of India
| 
| 27 || 1 ||  3 || 0.68 || 2,59,508 || 16.12 ||  13.4
|-
| 
| style="text-align:left;" |Janata Party
| 
| 140 || 21 || - || 14.28 || 24,01,566 || 32.03 ||
|-
| 
|
| 374 || 7 || N/A || 4.76 || 8,23,850 || 11.54 || N/A
|- class="unsortable" style="background-color:#E9E9E9"
! colspan = 3|
! style="text-align:center;" |Total Seats !! 147 !! style="text-align:center;" |Voters !! 1,53,37,200 !! style="text-align:center;" |Turnout !! colspan = 2|80,16,583 (52.27%)
|}

Punjab

Puducherry

Rajasthan

Sikkim

Uttar Pradesh

References

External links

 Election Commission of India

1985 elections in India
India
1985 in India
Elections in India by year